Koodo Mobile is a Canadian mobile flanker brand started by Telus in 2008 and mostly oriented toward younger customers. Koodo differs from its parent Telus by not requiring a fixed term contract. Koodo currently provides postpaid, prepaid, and wireless home phone services. Being a subsidiary of Telus, Koodo has been able to offer extensive coverage and a strong presence in mobile retailers. This allowed Koodo to gain a presence nationwide.

The brand name is a variation of the Ancient Greek word "κῦδος" (the ascendant to the English word "kudos"), meaning "praise, renown, glory" and more recently "acclaim for something well done".

History

Amp'd Mobile (2007) 
Telus Mobility's competitor, Bell Mobility, had an MVNO partnership with Virgin Group to create Virgin Mobile Canada. This brand was in operation since 2005, and it mainly targeted high school, college and university students. In response, Telus Mobility had a similar but much shorter partnership with the American Amp'd Mobile in 2007 to create a Canadian MVNO. It was ended because the Amp'd Mobile operations in the United States suffered from poor customer service and bankruptcy. This meant that unlike Bell, Telus no longer had a mobile brand targeting students.

Koodo Mobile launches (2008-2009)  
Nearly a year after the launch day of Amp'd Mobile in Canada, Telus launched Koodo Mobile on March 17, 2008, in Canada. This mobile brand provided services at a lower cost than most other companies.

BlackBerry and transition to HSPA+ (2010)  
Many customers at Koodo requested the addition of full QWERTY keyboard devices to facilitate text input for SMS and Internet-based tasks such as email and social networking services. On May 25, 2010, Koodo launched their first smartphone, the BlackBerry Curve 8530.  The following month, Koodo released the Nokia 3710 as their first HSPA+ device on June 28, 2010. After this date, the company gradually started to discontinue sales of CDMA devices.

HSPA+ smartphones and Canada-wide monthly plans (2011)  
Half a dozen of HSPA+ smartphones were released in 2011. The first was the LG Optimus One, launched on March 2. Later that month, the BlackBerry Curve 9300 was available starting March 23. The Nexus S was added to Koodo's lineup on April 12, 2011. In order to prepare for the back-to-school season, Koodo discontinued sales of all CDMA devices near the end of June 2011, less than a year after the carrier launched their first HSPA device. Shortly thereafter, they were replaced by the iPhone 4 and two low-cost Android devices.

In addition to revamping their device lineup, Koodo also improved their monthly plans throughout the year. The "City Koodo" plan, which is nearly identical to the CityFido plan offered by Fido, was introduced on March 14, 2011, in select cities. On July 21, 2011, Koodo eliminated all their previous plans, except for City Koodo which is still available in certain cities. Five new Canada-wide plans were launched instead, featuring no long distance charges when a Koodo customer located in Canada calls another standard Canadian landline or mobile phone number.

Plan refreshes, Windows Phone and prepaid service (2012)  
Koodo's postpaid plans were refreshed on February 3, 2012. The prices for all plans other than City Koodo were increased by $5/month, and both the caller ID and voice mail features are now included. Customers activating these plans, however, would now be billed per minute instead of per second.

The Nokia Lumia 610, launched by Koodo on July 6, 2012, was the carrier's first Windows Phone smartphone. On August 22, 2012, for the back-to-school season, Koodo introduced Koodo Prepaid at its own stores and Walmart. The service requires the customer to pay for a prepaid monthly plan, contrary to most other carriers offering a prepaid plan with no fixed monthly fee. All plans include unlimited SMS and MMS messaging, and all but the lowest priced one also include a period of unlimited local talk time. Two categories of nationwide add-ons, marketed as "boosters", can be used to add à la carte talk time or mobile broadband. Koodo Prepaid is Canada's first, and currently the only, provider to offer non-expiring add-ons as long as the monthly fee is paid. Thus, a customer can purchase an add-on in one month but use it over the course of multiple months.

On Black Friday in 2012, Koodo again revamped its postpaid plan lineup. The amount of anytime minutes was reduced in non-unlimited plans, although unlimited weekends was added for the first time to the lowest priced plan. Like its competitor Fido, unlimited text, picture and video messaging was now included in all new plans instead of a 50 sent messages limit. For non-BlackBerry devices, Data Saver is also included with these plans, with charges occurring if any mobile broadband is used.

Networks
Mobile services provided by Koodo use Telus Mobility's HSPA+ and LTE networks. CDMA devices, however, have been discontinued January 31, 2017. Koodo Mobile's HSPA networks uses the 850 MHz and 1900 MHz frequencies, their LTE network uses 1700/2100 MHz (AWS), and their LTE-a network uses 2600 MHz and 700 MHz.

Products
Koodo's product lineup mainly consists of smartphones but also includes a few feature phones. Smartphones are currently sold with one of two operating systems preloaded: Android or iOS. Koodo currently carries phones from Alcatel, Apple, Blackberry, Essential, Google, Huawei, LG, and Samsung.

All devices carried by Koodo are, or at least previously were, also available at Telus Mobility.

Services
As an incumbent flanker brand, Koodo's plans tend to cost less per month than the incumbent brands but more than new entrants. Plan features can only be used within Canada in locations served by Koodo. The Data Saver add-on is designed to simplify the purchase of mobile Internet services. Initially, the Koodo Tab allowed customers to receive a subsidized phone, by applying a portion of the monthly bill to the customer's Tab. In 2015, Koodo discontinued this, and on top of the monthly plan they started charging an additional Tab charge for 24 months; the amount of this Tab charge varies according to the phone chosen by the customer.

Voice plans
Koodo is a discount wireless brand, offering budget plans since its launch.

On September 21, 2011, Koodo has revamped and simplified their plans. Long distance charges for calls made from Canada to a Canadian number, or any call received in Canada. All the plans include unlimited nights and weekends.

While they now feature the caller ID and voicemail calling features, per-second billing was replaced with per-minute billing.

Prepaid monthly plans were introduced on August 22, 2012, for the back-to-school season. All plans include unlimited text, and all except the lowest priced one also include a period of unlimited provincial talk time. Two categories of nationwide add-ons, marketed as "boosters", can be used to add à la carte minutes or mobile broadband.

All current prepaid and postpaid plans include the caller ID, call waiting, conference call and voicemail calling features. Postpaid customers also have the "Family Calling" feature, which allows unlimited Canada-wide calls to other people on the same account, with up to a total of five people per account.

On April 12, 2018, Koodo and its parent company Telus introduced a $30 connection fee (See system access fee).

Data services
Various data services are available at Koodo. These include fixed monthly data allowances, smartphone plans with Internet access included, and exclusively to Koodo, Shock-Free Data, in which Koodo will notify you after using 50%, 90% and 100% of your data and pausing your data usage at 100% with a prompt asking if you would like to purchase more.

With Shock-Free Data, you can purchase 300MB for $12 or 1GB for $22. As well, you can use your plans' pay-per-use rate which currently sits at 100MB for $7 but older plans may have different rates.

Koodo's Canada-Wide Data monthly plan is a smartphone plan that includes 1 GB of usage for any phone. This plan succeeds the discontinued "Stay Social Combo" monthly plan, which included BlackBerry Social features for a BlackBerry or a 100 MB allowance for all other phones. Some older customers may have a grandfathered version of this plan, but they will lose it if they switch to a newer plan.

Koodo started offering eSIM on its plans on January 9, 2020. Customers with the eSIM enabled devices and smartphones can purchase the eSIM voucher online and connect to the network.

Koodo announced they will be launching the VoLTE and WiFi calling to their customer, enabling more features of their products to their customer.

Telus announced on February 16, 2022, that new Koodo Mobile subscribers and those who change plans to a new 4G plan will now have a speed cap of 100 Mbps, while consumers on the company's older 4G LTE plans do not have a speed limit. The announcement happened the same day Telus announced similar data speed caps on their plans.

Koodo Tab
Instead of a fixed term contract, Koodo Mobile uses a system called the Tab. A credit check is necessary prior to activation. For a new customer, a small tab takes up to $240 off the price of a new cell phone, a medium takes up to $360, and a large covers up to $504. Said amount is then applied as an interest-free loan to the customer's account. Customers will be billed the dollar amount on the tab over a 24-month period interest-free, unless they cancel their service with Koodo Mobile. Anyone using the Tab can pay off the remaining amount and keep the phone if they decide to leave.

Reception

The success Koodo received in its first year of operation, with its simple plan lineup and lack of carrier-charged system access and 911 fees, prompted competitors Rogers Wireless and Bell Mobility to mimic Koodo's monthly plans via their mobile brands: Fido Solutions for Rogers, and Virgin Mobile for Bell Mobility. These changes happened on November 4, 2008, for Fido. Following Bell's complete acquisition of Virgin Mobile Canada in May 2009, the Virgin brand mimicked several of Koodo's monthly plans in 2010.

Similarly, when Koodo launched its new Canada-wide plans on July 21, 2011, they were once again mimicked by other mobile brands. Virgin initially offered long distance as a $10 add-on on September 7, 2011, but reduced this fee to $5 about a week later on September 16, and removed it altogether on October 4.  This only applies for Virgin's talk and text plans.

Controversy

Discontinuation of per-second billing

Numerous current and prospective Koodo customers became disappointed and frustrated with the removal of per-second billing on Koodo Mobile's February 2012 monthly voice plans. Customers were given no advance warnings of these changes, although a third-party blog did provide a leaked brochure of the new per-minute plans. These plans cost $5/month more than their previous counterpart and include the caller ID and voicemail features, but are billed per minute instead of per second. One of the five plans was also lowered to 100 minutes instead of the 150 previously included, but the backlash to this change prompted the company to reverse this decision. Customers on Koodo's Facebook profile and the operator's Get Satisfaction Internet forum criticized the removal of per-second billing, perceiving it as "one step forward, two steps back". Existing customers with old plans are grandfathered with per-second billing, but will receive per-minute billing if they change their plan. There are currently over 100 frustrated customers voicing their support for per-second billing, some threatening to leave the operator. An April Fools' Day spoof joking about Koodo billing per hour has also been posted by the thread's creator.

Advertising
Koodo Mobile currently has Toronto-based Camp Jefferson (formerly DARE Toronto) as its  advertising agency. This team launched Koodo Mobile's "Choose Happy" campaign on April 20, 2015. The brand uses bright and punchy colours with vivid imagery and playful animations.
Previously, advertising efforts were handled by Taxi 2 in Toronto. This team developed the El Tabador character, starting March 2010, to promote the Koodo Tab. The character is a masked male lucha libre wrestler, who has been featured in billboards and also on animated TV ads.

The character was discontinued as part of a brand refresh that occurred in 2015, as part of the provider's new campaign "Choose Happy".

Retail presence
Koodo Mobile has its own corporate retail boutiques and also allows third parties to become exclusive dealers. Best Buy, Loblaw Companies, Walmart, and London Drugs stores in Canada provide Koodo products and services.

Former retailers

Zellers previously sold Koodo Mobile products. They simply consisted of CDMA feature phones at regular retail price. Activations had to be done online or by phone with Koodo, because Zellers did not provide cellular activations in store. Koodo was later removed from Zellers' product lineup, although unsold stock remained available at stores that did not return the devices to the operator.

Target Canada used to sell Koodo until they exited from Canada.

See also
 List of Canadian mobile phone companies

References

External links
 Koodo Mobile

Canadian brands
Mobile phone companies of Canada
Telecommunications companies of Canada
Telus
Telecommunications companies established in 2008